The Inn on Boltwood, formerly known as the Lord Jeffrey Inn, in Amherst, Massachusetts, dates from 1926.

It is associated with Amherst College via ownership by the Amherst Inn Company, an affiliate of the college.

It includes Colonial Revival architecture.

Poet Robert Frost was a frequent guest. Archibald MacLeish was also a guest. A gala honoring Frost's 80th birthday was held at the property in 1954.

It is a member of the Historic Hotels of America.

References

External links
Inn on Boltwood, official site

Hotels in Massachusetts
Buildings and structures in Amherst, Massachusetts
Hotel buildings completed in 1926
Historic Hotels of America